Acmaeodera nigrovittata is a species of metallic wood-boring beetle in the family Buprestidae. A. Nigrovittata is found in North America.

References

Further reading

 
 
 

nigrovittata
Articles created by Qbugbot
Beetles described in 1934